Miss Grand Spain 2021 is the 5th  edition of Miss Grand Spain beauty contest, held at Hotel Orquídea, Bahía Feliz Las Palmas on 16 May 2021. The Miss Grand Spain 2021 is Alba Dunkerbeck from Costa Canaria crowned her successor, Alba Dunkerbeck then represented Spain at the Miss Grand International 2021 pageant held on December 4 in Thailand.

Results

Contestants
27 delegates were selected by regional licensees to compete for the national title of Miss Grand Spain 2021.

References

External links

 Miss Grand Spain official website

Grand Spain
Miss Grand Spain
Beauty pageants in Spain